Qaleh-ye Jangi (also Romanized as Qal‘eh-ye Jangī) is a village in Ebrahimabad Rural District, Ramand District, Buin Zahra County, Qazvin Province, Iran. At the 2006 census, its population was 316, in 95 families.

References 

Populated places in Buin Zahra County